William Nicol DL (15 September 1790 – 8 August 1879) was a Scottish surgeon, founder of the firm Wm. Nicol & Co, and Conservative Party Member of Parliament for Dover.

He was born 15 September 1790 at Fawsyde, in the parish of Kinneff, in the Mearns. He was educated in Aberdeen.

In 1810, Nicol went to Bombay on board the ship Carmarthen as surgeon. Nicol settled in Bombay in 1820 and founded the firm of Wm. Nicol & Co. in Bombay, in 1820. He left Bombay in 1828. Nicol retired from Wm. Nicol & Co. in 1839, and went to England.

Nicol was Member of Parliament for Dover from 1859 to 1865.

Nicol was later a J.P. and Deputy Lieutenant for Kincardineshire.

Nicol died in London on 8 August 1879, and is buried in Brompton Cemetery, London.

He married his cousin Margaret Dyce Nicol (1799–1860) in Bombay on 4 January 1822. They had no issue.

References

External links 
 

1790 births
1879 deaths
19th-century Scottish people
People from Kincardine and Mearns
Burials at Brompton Cemetery
Conservative Party (UK) MPs for English constituencies
Deputy Lieutenants of Kincardineshire
Scottish sailors
Scottish surgeons
UK MPs 1859–1865
Members of the Parliament of the United Kingdom for Dover
19th-century Scottish businesspeople